Go Go Get Down (also titled as Go Go Get Down: Pure Ghetto Funk from Washington, D.C.) is a double-compilation album, consisting of prominent go-go songs remixed and compiled by DJ and producer Joey Negro. The album was released on his record label, Z Records, in 2012.

Track listing

Disc 1
Little Benny & the Masters – "Who Comes to Boogie" (7:34)
Chuck Brown & the Soul Searchers – "Back It On Up" (6:35)
Donald Banks – "Status Quo"(10:00)
Rare Essence – "Body Moves" (7:21)
Experience Unlimited – "Rock Yer Butt" (4:05)
Expression – "Release Disco" (5:38)
Osiris – "War (On the Bullshit!)" (10:18)
AM-FM – "You are the One" (5:49)
Familiar Faces – "The New Dance" (4:08)
Backlash – "Hang With the Gang" (5:14)
Static Disruptors – "DC Groove" (3:42)
Jackie Boy & Nature's Creation – "This Groove is Made for Funkin'" (8:31)

Disc 2
Experience Unlimited – "Somebody’s Ringing That Doorbell (Express Yourself)" (9:16)
Davis Pinckney Project (Go-Go Lorenzo) – "You Can Dance" (7:43)
Trouble Funk – "Get Down With Your Get Down" (6:52)
Code Red – "Virginia Gone Go-Go" (5:55)
The Mighty Peacemakers – "Feel It" (6:55)
Class Band – "Welcome to the Go-Go" (6:02)
The Soul Searchers – "Boogie Up the Nation" (5:32)
C.J's Uptown Crew – "Satisfaction Guaranteed" (6:02)
Ovation – "Boogie Groove (You Got to Do It)" (7:14)
Jim Bennett & His Bumpin' Crew – "Bump & Roll (Give Up the Funk)" (5:24)
Experience Unlimited – "E.U. Groove" (3:51)
Dr Skunk Funk – "Skunk Funk Go-Go" (6:11)

References

External links
"Go Go Get Down at AllMusic
"Go Go Get Down"  at Z Records

2012 compilation albums
2012 remix albums
Go-go albums